Leptospermum semibaccatum is a species of low, dense shrub that is endemic to eastern Australia. It has egg-shaped to narrow elliptical leaves with a blunt tip, white or pink flowers and hairy, flat-topped fruit that falls from the plant shortly after the seeds are released. It grows in poorly-drained soil in coastal heath.

Description
It has thin, flaking bark, the young stems hairy, at least at first. There are many reddish brown bracts at the base of the flower bud but which mostly fall off before the flower opens. The fruit are shed soon after the seeds are released.

Taxonomy and naming
Leptospermum semibaccatum was first formally described in 1932 by Edwin Cheel in the Journal and Proceedings of the Royal Society of New South Wales, from specimens collected by C.T.White on Moreton Island.

Distribution and habitat
This tea-tree grows in sandy soil in poorly drained coastal heath between Bundaberg in Queensland and Forster in New South Wales.

References

semibaccatum
Flora of New South Wales
Flora of Queensland
Myrtales of Australia
Plants described in 1932
Taxa named by Edwin Cheel